Woodard may refer to:

 Alfre Woodard (born 1952), American actress
 Beulah Woodard (1895–1955), American sculptor
 Brandon Woodard (born 1990), American politician
 Charlayne Woodard (born 1953), American playwright and actress
 Charles F. Woodard (1848–1907), Justice of the Maine Supreme Judicial Court
 Colin Woodard (born 1968), American journalist and writer
 Cora Lily Woodard (1868–1952), American political hostess
 David Woodard (born 1964), American conductor and writer
 Dick Woodard (1926–2019), American football player
 Duane Woodard (born 1938), 34th Colorado Attorney General
 Dustin Woodard (born 1997), American football player
 Frederick Augustus Woodard (1854–1915), American politician
 George Woodard, American actor and dairy farmer
 Horace Woodard (1904–1973), American cinematographer and producer
 Isaac Woodard (1919–1992), American World War II veteran and police brutality victim
 Jonathan Woodard (born 1993), American football player
 Lyman Woodard (1942–2009), American jazz organist
 Lynette Woodard (born 1959), American basketball player and coach
 Marc Woodard (born 1970), American football player
 Michael J. Woodard (born 1997), American singer and voice actor
 Mike Woodard (baseball) (born 1960), American baseball player
 Mike Woodard (politician) (born 1959), American politician
 Milt Woodard (1911–1996), American sportswriter and football executive
 Nathaniel Woodard (1811–1891), English Anglican priest and educator
 Pamela Woodard, American cardiovascular physician
 Ray Woodard (born 1961), American football player and coach
 Ray Woodard (soccer coach), (1936–2009), American soccer player and coach
 Robert Woodard (born 1939), English educator
 Robert Woodard II (born 1999), American basketball player
 Stacy Woodard (1902–1942), American producer and cinematographer
 Steve Woodard (born 1975), American baseball pitcher
 Wayne Francis Woodard (1914–1964), American artist and writer
 Willard Woodard (1824–1891), American politician, publisher, and parks advocate
 Woodard Schools

See also 
 Woodards
 Woodward (disambiguation)

References

English-language surnames
English toponymic surnames
Surnames of English origin
Surnames of British Isles origin